Sheema Kermani (also spelled Kirmani) (born 16 January 1951) is a Pakistani dancer and social activist. She is the founder of Tehrik-e-Niswan Cultural Action Group (Women's Movement). She is also an exponent of Bharatanatyam dance. She is also a renowned classical dancer, choreographer, dance guru, theatre practitioner, performer, director, producer, and TV actor based in Karachi, Pakistan. She advocates on culture, women's rights, and peace issues. 

Her pioneering contribution to the promotion of culture and theatrical performances in Pakistan since 1978 have led to international acclaim.

Early life and education 
Kermani was born on 16 January 1951 in Rawalpindi in an Army family. Kermani's father was a retired Brigadier from Pakistan Army and a Chairman of Karachi Electric Supply Corporation. Her education was at convent schools where her father used to get posted.

Career
When she was 8 years old, Kermani started to learn piano and Western classical music. From the age of 13, she began to learn classical Indian dance from Mr. and Mrs. Ghanshyam (a couple from Calcutta, who had set up a center for dance and music in Karachi). She later joined their institute as a member of their staff and performing troupe. Kermani was the only dancer in Pakistan throughout the years of General Zia-ul-Haq's martial law, when dance was banned and came to be seen as an activity highly disliked by the state and the clergy.

She received her early education from Presentation Convent Rawalpindi.  After doing O-Level from Convent of Jesus and Mary, Karachi, she completed her A- Level from Karachi Grammar School and then proceeded to Croydon College of Art, London to study fine arts. She holds a degree of Bachelor of Arts from the University of the Punjab, Lahore, and a Masters and M. Phil Degree in History from University of Karachi, where she is presently enrolled for PhD.

She realized that women in the Pakistani society were not able to get equality in the society so she started a movement called 'Tehrik-e-Niswan' (Women's Movement) and raised her voice for their rights, health issues, education and equality.

Kermani started learning Bharatanatyam in the mid-1960s. Her first solo performance was at Pakistan in 1984. In 1988, she proceeded to India on an ICCR (Indian Council of Cultural Relations) scholarship and studied Bharatanatyam under Leela Samson, Kathak under Ram Mohan and Odissi under Guru Mayadhar Raut and Aloka Pannikar. She also conducts theater workshops under the guidance of theater director Prasanna Ramaswamy in Karachi and heads a cultural organization, Tehrik-e-Niswan in Karachi.

2017 appearances 
On 19 February 2017, Kermani appeared at the Shrine of Lal Shahbaz Qalandar in Sehwan after the barbaric suicide attack and performed a dhamal (a Sufi dance form). She gave a passionate performance and told the media that nobody can stop music and dance.

She performed at the Faiz Aman Mela, Lahore where she paid a tribute to Asma Jahangir. She said we can bring peace, harmony and equality by loving each other and by sharing the message of love with each other.

2022 appearance 
In February 2022, she appeared in the music video for the song "Pasoori" as part of Season 14 of Coke Studio. This special performance was covered by the leading Indian print media, including ThePrint and The Indian Express.

Filmography

Television series

Tributes and awards
 In 2019, Taimur Rahim (a documentary film maker from Pakistan) made a short film (named: With Bells On Her Feet on the life) based on the life of Kermani. The documentary focused on the classical dancer's life and fight for social justice during Zia-ul-Haq's regime and it was released in South Asian Film Festival of Montreal (SAFFM). The film bagged two accolades – Best Short Film and the Audience Choice Award.

 In 2013, Kermani received ACHA Peace Star Award from Oregon-based Association for Communal Harmony in Asia (ACHA) on her life-long contributions for peace, communal harmony and women's rights activism, particularly in South Asia. The ceremony was held at the Arts Council of Pakistan Karachi, organized in cooperation with the Pakistan Peace Coalition and the Pakistan Institute of Labor Education and Research.

 In 2012, Kermani received Women of Inspiration Award from Wonder Women Association on her struggle and devotion for well-being of Pakistani women and her passion for gender equality.

 In year 2005, Kermani was selected by PeaceWomen Across the Globe as one of the most influential women of Pakistan, and was nominated for Nobel Peace Prize on her services and contributions for Bharatanatyam dance, as well as, for her pioneering contribution to the promotion of culture and theatrical performances in Pakistan.

References

1951 births
20th-century Pakistani actresses
Living people
Odissi exponents
People from Karachi
Pakistani choreographers
21st-century Pakistani actresses
Pakistani female dancers
Dance teachers
Bharatanatyam exponents
Pakistani human rights activists
Pakistani television actresses